Frantix is a video game on Sony's PlayStation Portable developed by American studio Killer Game. The game contains over 150 levels (most need to be unlocked). The player must race against the clock in order to solve each puzzle. Some levels are tricky and the most obvious path may not be the best route to go. In each level there are obstacles, deadly traps, hazards and creatures which can delay the player from completing the level.

Features
The game includes the 3D animated short film The ChubbChubbs!; the film's central character,  Meeper, is unlocked as a playable character early in the game.

Reception

Frantix received mixed reviews from critics. On Metacritic, the game holds a score of 59/100 based on 29 reviews, indicating "mixed or average reviews". On GameRankings, the game holds a score of 59.98% based on 45 reviews.

References

External links
Frantix on IGN

2005 video games
Ubisoft games
PlayStation Portable games
PlayStation Portable-only games
Puzzle video games
Video games developed in the United States